Fountain Hill is a town in Ashley County, Arkansas, United States. The population was 175 at the 2010 census.

Geography
Fountain Hill is located at  (33.355421, -91.851173).

Demographics

As of the census of 2000, there were 159 people, 66 households, and 39 families residing in the town. The population density was 104.1/km2 (271.0/mi2). There were 77 housing units at an average density of 50.4/km2 (131.3/mi2). The racial makeup of the town was 60.38% White, 35.22% Black or African American, 1.89% from other races, and 2.52% from two or more races. 2.52% of the population were Hispanic or Latino of any race.

There were 66 households, out of which 19.7% had children under the age of 18 living with them, 47.0% were married couples living together, 10.6% had a female householder with no husband present, and 40.9% were non-families. 33.3% of all households were made up of individuals, and 18.2% had someone living alone who was 65 years of age or older. The average household size was 2.41 and the average family size was 3.08.

In the town, the population was spread out, with 24.5% under the age of 18, 10.1% from 18 to 24, 22.6% from 25 to 44, 26.4% from 45 to 64, and 16.4% who were 65 years of age or older. The median age was 39 years. For every 100 females, there were 80.7 males. For every 100 females age 18 and over, there were 84.6 males.

The median income for a household in the town was $25,250, and the median income for a family was $37,750. Males had a median income of $22,000 versus $16,875 for females. The per capita income for the town was $12,568. About 2.7% of families and 10.6% of the population were below the poverty line, including 4.0% of those under the age of eighteen and 17.2% of those 65 or over.

Education 
Public education is provide to elementary and secondary school students from the Hamburg School District leading to graduation from Hamburg High School.

Prior to school district consolidation on July 1, 2004, students attended Fountain Hill School District, and its Fountain Hill High School, which had the Wildcat as its mascot.

Notable people
 Joseph Jackson, born in Fountain Hill, (1928–2018) father and manager of Michael Jackson and The Jackson 5.
 Jeremy Sparks, hall of fame cowboy and author, graduate of Fountain Hill
 Jenny Wingfield, screenwriter and author, born in Fountain Hill

References

Towns in Ashley County, Arkansas
Towns in Arkansas